Shapeshifter is the ninth studio album released under the name Gong and the sixth album by the Daevid Allen version of the group. It was released in 1992. It is the first proper album from Daevid Allen's Gong since  You from 1974. It is the first album from the original group without founding member Gilli Smyth. Didier Malherbe and Allen are the only two returning performers from the previous album. Pip Pyle, who performed on Continental Circus and Camembert Electrique also returns.

With main character Zero the hero, the album continues the Gong mythology, the central part of which was formed with the Radio Gnome Trilogy of albums, comprising Flying Teapot in 1973, followed by Angel's Egg, 1973, and You in 1974.

Releases
Over the years since 1992, there have been different releases of the album with different numbers of tracks. On "the original as it was planned", the Gong website lists #12: "Là Bas Là Bas" and #13: "I Gotta Donkey" - these are not found on the 1997 Lightyear release. That release has a closing bonus track titled "Goddess Invocation Om Riff", recorded live at Ynys Witren at summer solstice 1992.

Reception

Paul Stump's 1997 History of Progressive Rock assessed that "The amalgam of trance-beats, crude sampling (dog samples for 'Dog-o-matic' et al.) and rowdy guitar splurges was among the most complete reintegration of Progressive ideology and cutting-edge contemporary music since the 1960s."

Track listing
 "Gnomerique" (Allen) − 0:07
 "Shapeshifter" (Allen, Malherbe) − 4:53
 "Hymnalayas" (Allen, Bailey) − 7:38
 "Dog-o-matic" (Maitra) − 3:00
 "Spirit With Me" (Allen, Ehrlich) − 2:27
 "Mr Albert Parkin" (Clark) − 0:17
 "Raindrop Tablas" (Maitra) − 0:21
 "Give My Mother a Soul Call" (Yogananda) − 4:30
 "Heaven's Gate" (Allen, Bailey) − 4:49
 "Snake Tablas" (Maitra) − 0:34
 "Loli" (Allen, Clark) − 5:09
 "Là Bas Là Bas" (Couture, Allen) − 4:06
 "I Gotta Donkey" (Allen) − 2:12
 "Can: You Can" (Malherbe) − 9:09
 "Confiture de Rhubarbier" (Pyle) − 1:18
 "Parkin Triumphant" (Clark) − 0:06
 "Longhaired Tablas" (Maitra) − 0:14
 "Éléphant la Tête" (Malherbe, Maitra) - 4:41
 "Mother's Gone" (Allen) − 1:12
 "Éléphant la Cuisse" (Malherbe, Clark) − 3:26
 "White Doves" (Viraj, Sunsinger) − 5:24
 "Gnomoutro" (Allen) − 0:27

Bonus track
"Goddess Invocation Om Riff" (Allen, Blake, Hillage, Howlett, Smyth) − 12:58

Personnel
 Daevid Allen: Acoustic, glissando and lewd guitarplay, vocals, midwifery
 Graham Clark: Violins, voices
 Shyamal Maitra: Tablas, ghatam, djembé, darbuka, techno percs, programming. Drums on 13
 Keith Bailey: Bass guitar, vocals: 2, 9
 Didier Malherbe: Bass, tenor, alto and soprano saxophones. WX7, keyboards, dogs, piccolo, flutes
 Pip Pyle: Drums, ten green bottles and scream

Guest personnel

 Charlelie Couture: Vocals: 12
 Tom the Poet: Instant radio poetry during US tour with Daevid: 13
 Loy Ehrlich: Keyboards: 8, Kora: 5
 Mark Robson: Keyboards and sportin' vocals: 22

Additional personnel on bonus track
In the Allmusic review of the 1997 release, additional personnel is listed:
 Mike Howlett: Bass
 Peter Kimberley: Vocals
 Steffi Sharpstrings: Guitar
 Gilli Smyth: Space Whisper, Vocals, Whistle (Human)
 Twink: Synthesizer

References

External links
Shapeshifter review at www.aural-innovations.com

1992 albums
Concept albums
Gong (band) albums
Post-punk albums by British artists
Space rock albums
Celluloid Records albums
Lightyear Entertainment albums